Sarab-e Shah Hoseyn (also Romanized as Sarāb-e Shāh Ḩoseyn; also known as Sarāb-e Shāh Ḩoseynī) is a village in Poshtdarband Rural District, in the Central District of Kermanshah County, Kermanshah Province, Iran. At the 2006 census, its population was 141, in 31 families.

References 

Populated places in Kermanshah County